The Costa Blanca (literally meaning "White Coast") is over  of Mediterranean coastline in the Alicante province, on the southeastern coast of Spain. It extends from the town of Dénia in the north, beyond which lies the Costa del Azahar (or Costa dels Tarongers), to Pilar de la Horadada in the south, beyond which lies the Costa Cálida.

The name Costa Blanca was coined in the 1950s as a way to promote tourism. The region has a well-developed tourism industry and is a popular destination for British and German tourists.

The localities along the Costa Blanca are Alicante (Alicante/Alacant), Altea, Benidorm, Benissa (Benisa), Calp (Calpe), Dénia (Denia), Elche (Elche/Elx), El Campello (Campello), Finestrat, Guardamar del Segura, L'Alfàs del Pi (Alfaz del Pi), Orihuela Costa, Pilar de la Horadada, Santa Pola, Teulada–Moraira, Torrevieja, Villajoyosa (Villajoyosa/La Vila Joiosa) and Xàbia (Xàbia/Jávea). Benidorm and Alicante are the major tourist centres.

History 

The Iberians are the oldest people known to have lived in what is now Alicante province. Among several Iberian archaeologic sites, La Serreta (near Alcoy) is noteworthy as the location of the longest inscriptions ever found in the (still undeciphered) Iberian language.

During the same period, the Phoenicians (in Guardamar) and Greeks (along the coast north of Alicante city) created coastal colonies and interacted with the Iberians.  The Lady of Elche is a famous archeological find from this period.

After a brief Carthaginian period, the Romans took over the area.  Several cities thrived along the Via Augusta, which connected this part of Iberia to the rest of the Roman empire.  One of those cities, Ilici Augusta (now Elche) even reached the status of colonia.

After briefly being ruled by the Visigoths, the area was captured by Islamic armies and became a part of Al Andalus. Beginning in the 13th century, kings like Ferdinand III of Castile, James I of Aragon, Alfonso X of Castile, and James II of Aragon slowly reconquered the cities in the area. 

What is now Alicante province was initially split between the Crown of Castile and the Crown of Aragon by means of the Treaty of Almizra.  Later, the whole territory became under the control of the Kingdom of Valencia, which was one of the domains of the Crown of Aragon.

Politics 
Today, Alicante has 12 deputies in the Spanish Parliament.  It also has 36 deputies in the Corts Valencianes, the regional parliament of the Valencian Community.

Climbing
Costa Blanca is a popular climbing location thanks to its limestone crags and good weather conditions.

References

External links

Costa Blanca Tourism, official website by the Diputación Provincial de Alicante
Information about Costa Blanca, official website for Tourism in Spain
Landscapes of the Costa Blanca, photo gallery

Blanca
Geography of the Province of Alicante
Climbing areas of Spain